KUMC-LP (93.3 FM) is a radio station broadcasting a religious radio format. Licensed to Rupert, Idaho, United States, the station serves the Rupert area. The station is currently owned by Rupert United Methodist Church.

References

External links
 Official Website
 

UMC-LP
UMC-LP
United Methodist Church